Hansa () is a shopping centre in the city centre of Turku, in Finland. It is located in the city's VII District, next to the main Market Square. The shopping centre hosts a total of 156 businesses, including nineteen cafés and restaurants. It also contains a theatre. The Turku branch of the Stockmann department store is located in Hansa.

Hansa is usually considered as the most important shopping centre in Turku region, though it has lost some of its popularity to the out-of-town Mylly shopping centre in Raisio. The annual sales of Hansa in 2005 totalled over 170 million euros, making it the largest Finnish shopping centre outside the Greater Helsinki area. By number of visitors (approximately 13.5 million) Hansa is the third largest shopping centre in Finland.

Stores 

Hansa houses various stores and its goal is to serve as a one-stop shopping centre. Clothing products are available in 40 shops, leisure and household products in 35 shops, beauty and health products in 20 shops and a variety of café and restaurant services in nearly 20 cafés and restaurants.

Clothing stores include for example Crocs, Dressmann, Gant Store, Hennes & Mauritz, Jack & Jones, Lindex, Marimekko, Vero Moda and Zara clothing stores. Clothes are also sold by the two largest tenants of Hansa Emporium, Stockmann and Halonen. Other well-known chains include stores of for example the Body Shop and R-kioski. 

Restaurants include several cafeterias for example Arnolds Bakery and Coffee shop, several Aschan cafes, a Chinese restaurant, internet cafe, two Hesburgers and several other larger restaurants. Stockmann also has a large supermarket, Stockmann deli, which serves as the main grocery store inside the shopping centre.

Gallery

See also
 Skanssi (shopping centre)

References

External links 
   
 Virtual Turku - Hansakortteli

Shopping centres in Turku
Shopping malls established in 1985
1985 establishments in Sweden